A list of films produced in the Philippines in the 1950s. For an A-Z see :Category:Philippine films.

1950s

References

External links
 Filipino film at the Internet Movie Database
 asc&count=250 at the Internet Movie Database

1950s
Films
Philippines